The Centre de services scolaire au Cœur-des-Vallées  (CSSCV) is a school service centre headquartered in the Buckingham district of Gatineau, Quebec, in the Ottawa metropolitan area.

CSCV operates public schools in the Buckingham and Masson-Angers districts of Gatineau, as well as the Papineau Regional County Municipality (except Lac-des-Plages) and the L'Ange-Gardien and Notre-Dame-de-la-Salette municipalities of the Les Collines-de-l'Outaouais Regional County Municipality.

Schools

Primary and secondary:
 École Providence / J.-M.-Robert - St-André-Avellin - Occupies the Province and J.-M.-Robert buildings
 École Saint-Michel - Gatineau

Secondary:
 École secondaire Hormidas-Gamelin - Gatineau
 École Ste-famille/Trois-Chemins - Thurso 
 École secondaire Louis-Joseph Papineau - Papineauville

Primary schools in Gatineau:
 École aux Quatre-Vents 
 École du Boisé 
 École Monseigneur-Charbonneau 
 École du Ruisseau
 École du Sacré-Coeur
 École St-Jean-de-Brébeuf
 École St-Laurent

Primary schools in other municipalities:
 École Adrien-Guillaume - Chénéville
 École de la Montagne - Notre-Dame-de-la-Salette
 École Maria-Goretti - Thurso
 École du Sacré-Coeur - Plaisance
 École St-Coeur-de-Marie - Ripon
 École St-Pie X - Papineauville
 École St-Michel Montebello - Montebello

References

External links
 Commission scolaire au Cœur-des-Vallées 

Education in Gatineau
School districts in Quebec